The following is a list of  indoor arenas in South Africa, with a capacity of at least 4,000 Spectators. Most of the arenas in this list have multiple uses such as individual sports, team sports as well as cultural events and political events.

Current Arenas

Under construction
Rivers of living waters Arena in vereeeniging Unitas park

Future Arenas

See also
List of indoor arenas in Africa
List of football stadiums in South Africa

References

External links
 South Africa at WorldStadiums.com

Indoor arenas in South Africa
Indoor arenas
South Africa
Indoor arenas